The 1851 Wisconsin gubernatorial election was held on November 4, 1851. Whig candidate Leonard J. Farwell won the election with 51% of the vote, winning his first term as Governor of Wisconsin. Farwell defeated Democratic candidate Don A. J. Upham.

Democratic Party

Don A. J. Upham had been Mayor of Milwaukee for two years just prior to his run for Governor.  Before that, he had served extensively in the government of the Wisconsin Territory prior to statehood—as a member of the Council (upper chamber of the legislature) and as President of the first Constitutional Convention.

Whig Party

Leonard J. Farwell owned a considerable amount of land in the Madison area and had invested in improvements.  He had been active in establishing the Wisconsin Historical Society, the state agricultural society, the state public school system, and the state university.

Results

| colspan="6" style="text-align:center;background-color: #e9e9e9;"| General Election, November 4, 1851

Results by County

References

1851 Wisconsin elections
1851
Wisconsin
November 1851 events